= Kings and Usurpers in the Seleukid Empire =

About the Seleukid Empire

Kings and Usurpers in the Seleukid Empire: The Men who would be King
- 2016 Book jacket
- Author: Boris Chrubasik
- Series: Oxford Classical Monographs
- Subject: Classical History. Seleukid Empires. Syria--History. Syria--Kings and rulers. Syria--Politics and government.
- Genre: Nonfiction history
- Set in: Seleukid Empire 333 B.C. to 64 B.C.
- Publisher: Oxford University Press
- Publication date: 2016
- Publication place: United Kingdom
- Media type: Print, E-Book, PhD. thesis
- Pages: 360
- ISBN: 9780198786924
- OCLC: 944462967
- Dewey Decimal: 935/.062
- LC Class: DS96.2 .C47 2016
- Website: Oxford University Press

Kings and Usurpers in the Seleukid Empire: The Men who would be King is a nonfiction historical account, written by Boris Chrubasik. It explores the Seleukid Empire (333 B.C. to 64 B.C.) in relation to the usurpers that successfully or unsuccessfully arose over time. The book was published by Oxford University Press in October 2016.

== Synopsis ==
This work modifies the author's thesis and turns it into a book. The book consists of an introduction, five chapters, and four appendices. The author, Boris Chrubasik, examines the role of usurpers in the Seleukid Empire. This empire was one of the successor states of Alexander the Great. However, it was challenged by usurpers throughout its history.

Chrubasik argues that usurpers were not simply rebels or criminals, but rather they were men who were trying to legitimate their claims to power by appealing to the people and the army. Chrubasik notes that local power holders who minted coins or founded new settlements were not, at the same time, asserting independence from the empire. Rather they were taking advantage of the short term weakness of central authority. No permanent breach was created and the integrity of the Empire stayed intact.

Chrubasik also says that the King's authority was not derived from royal blood, kin succession or a legal right. Rather, each King's authority was derived from the assent of his subjects. Hence, his authority is a "form of social power, in which the ability to exercise authority ebbs and flows according to circumstances." And the individual accomplishments of non-royal challengers were a "platform for ruling." By framing the book on the dynamic of usurpers throughout the empire's history, Chrubasik "is able to explore the Seleucid monarchy in practice, rather than its ideology."
